Vranidoll (in Albanian) or Vrani Do (in Serbian; Врани До) is a village in the municipality of Pristina, in central Kosovo. It has about 200 houses and about 1500 inhabitants. It was settled by Albanians in the 18th century.

Notes

References

Villages in Pristina